Pseudagrion furcigerum is a species of damselfly in the family Coenagrionidae. It is commonly known as the Palmiet sprite.

Distribution and status
This sprite is endemic to South Africa; It is found at low elevations in the Western Cape and the south-western parts of the Eastern Cape. The species currently has no known threats. Its population is locally abundant and apparently stable.

Habitat
Adults are found at the margins of pools, streams and rivers that are well vegetated.

References

External links

 Pseudagrion furcigerum on African Dragonflies and Damselflies Online

Coenagrionidae
Insects described in 1842